UCD Ladies' Hockey Club is a women's field hockey club based in Dún Laoghaire–Rathdown, Ireland. It is the women's field hockey club of University College Dublin. In addition to playing in Colours matches with Dublin University and competing in intervarsity tournaments, the club also enter teams in the Women's Irish Hockey League, the Irish Senior Cup and the Irish Junior Cup. During the 2010s UCD has emerged as one Ireland's strongest teams in women's field hockey, winning three Irish Hockey League titles  and four Irish Senior Cups. UCD has also represented Ireland in the 2015 and 2018 EuroHockey Club Champions Cups.

History

Irish Senior Cup
UCD first won the Irish Senior Cup in 1951, captained by Patricia Horne. They then had to wait for fifty eight years before winning their second cup. In 2009 Grace O'Flanagan kept goal for UCD as they defeated Pegasus 4–1. With a team that included Dora Gorman, Chloe Watkins, Deirdre Duke and Anna O'Flanagan, UCD won the cup for a third time in 2012, after defeating Loreto 3–2 in the final. UCD where finalists again in 2013 but this time they lost 3–2 to Railway Union. The UCD squad for the final included Chloe Watkins, Anna O'Flanagan, Emily Beatty, Nicola Evans and Katie Mullan. Nicola Evans and Anna O'Flanagan both scored as UCD defeated Pembroke Wanderers 2–0 in the 2014 final. Katie Mullan, Emily Beatty, Gillian Pinder and Deirdre Duke were also members of the winning UCD team. In the 2017 final, Duke scored the winner as UCD defeated Cork Harlequins 1–0. Duke also captained the team which also featured Gillian Pinder, Elena Tice and Katie Mullan. Duke was again captain when UCD retained the cup in 2018 team after they defeated Pegasus 4–0. Elena Tice and Katie Mullan were also in the team.

Women's Irish Hockey League
UCD won their first Women's Irish Hockey League title in 2013–14 with a squad that included Katie Mullan, Gillian Pinder, Deirdre Duke, Nicola Evans, Anna O'Flanagan and Emily Beatty. The 2013–14 season saw UCD complete a treble. In addition to winning the national league title UCD also won the Women's Leinster Division One title and the Irish Senior Cup. The 
2016–17 season saw UCD claim the league title in dramatic fashion as Elena Tice scored two penalty corners to inflict a first league defeat on Hermes-Monkstown. The result saw UCD overtake Hermes-Monkstown on the final day of the campaign. The result also saw UCD win their second trophy in six days, adding to the Irish Senior Cup. UCD subsequently completed a treble when they also won the EY Champions Trophy after defeating Hermes-Monkstown in a penalty shoot-out. The 2017–18 season saw UCD retain the league title. Having already won the Irish Senior Cup, UCD also completed a double.

Irish Junior Cup
UCD's second team enter the Irish Junior Cup. They have been finalists on two occasions, winning the cup in 2014 and finishing as runners-up in 2018.

Chilean Cup
The Chilean Cup is a tournament featuring ladies' field hockey teams representing universities from the Republic of Ireland and Northern Ireland. UCD have been regular finalists and winners.

Recent appearances

EuroHockey Club Champions Cup
UCD has also represented Ireland in the 2015 and 2018 EuroHockey Club Champions Cups.

2015 EuroHockey Club Champions Cup
Quarter-finals

Fifth to eighth place classification

Fifth and sixth place

2018 EuroHockey Club Champions Cup
Quarter-finals

Fifth to eighth place classification

Seventh and eighth place

Notable players
 Ireland internationals
When the Ireland women's national field hockey team won the silver medal at the 2018 Women's Hockey World Cup, the squad included nine current or former UCD players. Deirdre Duke, Elena Tice and Katie Mullan were all members of UCD's 2017–18 squad. Gillian Pinder, Chloe Watkins, Grace O'Flanagan, Emily Beatty, Anna O'Flanagan and Nicola Evans were all UCD graduates.

Republic of Ireland association football international
  Dora Gorman
 Ireland women's rugby union international
  Jeamie Deacon

Honours
Women's Irish Hockey League
Winners: 2013–14, 2016–17, 2017–18: 3 
Irish Senior Cup
Winners: 1951, 2009, 2011–12, 2013–14, 2016–17, 2017–18, 2019-20: 7 
Runners Up: 2012–13: 1
Irish Junior Cup
Winners: 2014: 1 
Runners Up: 2018: 1
EY Champions Trophy
Winners: 2017

External links
 UCD Ladies Hockey Club on Twitter
 UCD Ladies Hockey Club on Facebook
 UCD Ladies Hockey Club on Instagram

References

 
Women's Irish Hockey League teams
Hockey
Field hockey clubs in Dún Laoghaire–Rathdown
University and college field hockey clubs in Ireland